The Players Theatre, located at 115 MacDougal Street between West 3rd and Bleecker Streets in the West Village neighborhood of Manhattan, is one of the oldest commercial Off-Broadway theatres in operation in New York City. The Players Theatre contains a main stage with more than 200 seats and a 50-seat black box theatre, as well as four rehearsal rooms. The historic Cafe Wha? is located in its basement.

History
It was built in 1907 as a carriage house where it served police horses until it was converted into a theatre in the late 1950s. Celebrities who have appeared on their stage including young Britney Spears and Natalie Portman in Ruthless! in 1992. In 2010 it served as the Off-Broadway home for Teller and Todd Robbins's Play Dead.

References

External links

The Players Theatre on the Internet Off-Broadway Database

Off-Broadway theaters
Greenwich Village
1950s establishments in New York (state)